The Gruithuisen Domes may refer to:

 Mons Gruithuisen Delta, a lunar dome 
 Mons Gruithuisen Gamma, a lunar dome